Myles Adams (born March 9, 1998) is an American football defensive end for the Seattle Seahawks of the National Football League (NFL). He played college football at Rice.

Early years

During his attendance at Mansfield Summit High School, Adams played in 22 games and had  43 total tackles, 9 tackles for loss, 7.5 sacks, 8 quarterback hurries, 1 interception, and 1 pass deflection.

College career

2016 season
In his 2016 freshman season, Adams appeared in 10 games, in which he recorded 9 tackles, 1 tackle for loss, 1 sack, and 1 forced fumble.

2017 season
In his 2017 sophomore season, Adams appeared in 12 games, in which he recorded 16 tackles and 1 tackle for loss.

2018 season
In his 2018 junior season, Adams appeared in 13 games and made 5 starts, in which he recorded 27 tackles, 5 tackles for loss, 2.5 sacks, and 2 forced fumbles.

2019 season
In his 2019 senior season, Adams appeared in and started all 12 games, in which he recorded 42 tackles, 3.5 tackles for loss, 1 sack, and 1 pass deflection. During this season, he was one of the team captains. He was also named an honorable mention for the All-Conference USA team, and he was a semifinalist for the William V. Campbell Trophy.

Professional career

Carolina Panthers
Adams went undrafted in the 2020 NFL Draft. On April 30, 2020, Adams was signed by the Carolina Panthers as an undrafted free agent. He was waived on September 5, 2020, before being signed to their practice squad the next day. He was released from the practice squad on September 18, 2020.

Seattle Seahawks
On December 2, 2020, Adams was signed by the Seattle Seahawks and placed on their practice squad.

On August 31, 2021, Adams was waived by the Seahawks and re-signed to the practice squad the next day. On December 21, 2021, Adams made his NFL debut in the team's week 15 game against the Los Angeles Rams. He signed a reserve/future contract with the Seahawks on January 10, 2022.

References

Living people
1998 births
American football defensive tackles
Rice Owls football players
Players of American football from Texas
Seattle Seahawks players
Sportspeople from Arlington, Texas